James T. Hargrett Jr. (born July 31, 1942) is a former state legislator in  Florida. He served in the Florida House of Representatives from 1982 to 1992 (63rd district). He also served in the Florida Senate from 1993 to 2000.

In 1998, Hargrett was one of several African-American Democrats in the Florida Legislature to endorse Republican Jeb Bush for Governor.

He is a descendant of Amos Hargrett.

See also
Andrew Hargrett
Doris Hargrett Clack

References

1942 births
Living people
Democratic Party members of the Florida House of Representatives
Politicians from Tampa, Florida
African-American state legislators in Florida
Morehouse College alumni
Atlanta University alumni
21st-century African-American people
20th-century African-American people